Christopher Trevor Brice (born 5 January 1983) is an English cricketer.  Brice is a left-handed batsman who bowls slow left-arm orthodox.  He was born in Leeds, Yorkshire.

Brice represented the Yorkshire Cricket Board in 3 List A matches.  These came against the Gloucestershire Cricket Board in the 2nd round of the 2002 Cheltenham & Gloucester Trophy which was held in 2001 and against Somerset in the 3rd round of the same competition which was held in 2002.  His final List A match came against Northumberland in the 2nd round of the 2003 Cheltenham & Gloucester Trophy which was played in 2002.  In his 3 List A matches, he scored 27 runs at a batting average of 13.50, with a high score of 17.  In the field he took a single catch.  With the ball he took 2 wickets at a bowling average of 77.00, with best figures of 1/22.

References

External links
Christopher Brice at Cricinfo
Christopher Brice at CricketArchive

1983 births
Living people
Cricketers from Leeds
English cricketers
Yorkshire Cricket Board cricketers